Bubacar Boi Djaló (born 2 February 1997) is a professional footballer who plays as a defensive midfielder for MLS Next Pro club Rochester NY. Born in Guinea-Bissau, he has represented Portugal at youth level.

Career
On 9 December 2015, Djaló made his professional debut with Sporting B in a 2015–16 Segunda Liga match against Desportivo das Aves coming on as a substitute for Daniel Podence.

In December 2019 it was confirmed, that Djaló had joined Finnish Veikkausliiga club, HJK in Helsinki, from the 2020 season, signing a one year deal with an option for two further years. On 26 January 2022, his contract with HJK was terminated by mutual consent.

On 7 February 2022, Djaló moved to the United States and signed with Rochester NY.

References

External links
Stats and profile at LPFP 
Sporting CP profile

1997 births
Living people
Sportspeople from Bissau
Bissau-Guinean emigrants to Portugal
Portuguese people of Bissau-Guinean descent
Bissau-Guinean footballers
Portuguese footballers
Bissau-Guinean expatriate footballers
Portuguese expatriate footballers
Association football midfielders
Liga Portugal 2 players
Sporting CP footballers
Sporting CP B players
Helsingin Jalkapalloklubi players
Rochester New York FC players
Portugal youth international footballers
Bissau-Guinean expatriate sportspeople in Finland
Portuguese expatriate sportspeople in Finland
Expatriate footballers in Finland
Portuguese expatriate sportspeople in the United States
Expatriate soccer players in the United States
MLS Next Pro players